Grzegorz Bodziana (born 3 June 1981) is a Polish biathlete. He competed in the men's 20 km individual event at the 2006 Winter Olympics.

References

1981 births
Living people
Polish male biathletes
Olympic biathletes of Poland
Biathletes at the 2006 Winter Olympics
People from Duszniki-Zdrój